Doomtree is the first official studio album by Minneapolis hip hop collective Doomtree. It was released by Doomtree Records on July 29, 2008.

Critical reception
Andrew Martin of Okayplayer gave the album a 75 out of 100, saying: "Similar to the production, the rapping on here ranges from above-average to incredible." Ben Westhoff of Pitchfork gave the album a 6.0 out of 10, saying, "even folks without 18 leftie bumper stickers on their cars will find it hard not to get caught up in the group's enthusiasm."

Chris Riemenschneider of Star Tribune placed it at number 6 on the "Best Local Albums of 2008" list. Adam Bernard of RapReviews.com placed it at number 4 on the "Top 10 Hip-Hop Albums of 2008" list.

Track listing

Charts

References

External links
 

2008 debut albums
Doomtree albums
Doomtree Records albums
Albums produced by Lazerbeak